Liberty Hill is an unincorporated community in Calhoun County, West Virginia, United States.

References 

Unincorporated communities in West Virginia
Unincorporated communities in Calhoun County, West Virginia